Edaphodon was a fish genus of the family Callorhinchidae (sometimes assigned to Edaphodontidae). As a member of the Chimaeriformes, Edaphodon was a type of rabbitfish, a cartilaginous fish related to sharks and rays. The genus appeared in the Aptian age of the Lower Cretaceous and vanished in the Pliocene. It was most prominent during the Late Cretaceous. Many Edaphodon species were found in the Northern Hemisphere, but species from the Southern Hemisphere are also known (e.g., E. kawai from New Zealand and E. snowhillensis from Antarctica).

Description
Like most other chimaeriforms, Edaphodon is known mainly from poorly preserved specimens because its skeleton was made of cartilage. So, in most cases, only tooth plates and fin spines have been preserved, and they are also often dissociated. Like other chimaeriforms, it fed using six pairs of tooth plates—one pair on the lower jaw (mandibular) and two pairs on the upper (vomerine and palatine), which bear tooth-like hypermineralized areas known as tritors. The patterning of the tritors is used to distinguish chimaeriforms. In Edaphodon, the vomerine tooth plates are covered in rod-like tritors; each palatine tooth plate is massive, and has one large tritor on the outer edge and two large tritor pads and one small tritor pad in the middle; and each mandibular tooth plate is massive and has a beak-like tritor at the front end, along with two pairs of tritor pads at their outer edges and a single large tritor pad in the middle.

The closest relative of Edaphodon was Ischyodus. They were generally similar, but Ischyodus had four large tritor pads on its palatine tooth plates, as well as thinner mandibular tooth plates with shorter beaks. Edaphodon would have used its tritors for both crushing hard-shelled and slicing other prey such as fishes, sharks, and marine reptiles. In the Upper Cretaceous of Alabama, where I. bifurcatus, E. barberi, and E. mirificus coexisted, the two genera may have had different diets, with Ischyodus feeding on more hard-shelled prey.

Externally, Edaphodon would have been similar to other rabbitfish in appearance. However, at least some species of Edaphodon would have been far larger. The largest mandibular tooth plates of the living Callorhinchus measure  in length; the largest E. sedgwickii mandibular tooth plates reach , and E. snowhillensis mandibular tooth plates also reached .

Species
Edaphodon has numerous species, all of which are extinct. They include:

Edaphodon agassizi - Buckland, 1835
Edaphodon antwerpiensis - Leriche, 1926
Edaphodon barberi - Applegate, 1970
Edaphodon bucklandi - Agassiz, 1843 (type species)
Edaphodon hesperis - Shin, 2010
Edaphodon kawai - Consoli, 2006
Edaphodon laqueatus - Leidy, 1873
Edaphodon latigerus - Cope, 1869
Edaphodon mantelli Buckland, 1835
Edaphodon minor Ward, 1973
Edaphodon mirificus - Leidy, 1856
Edaphodon snowhillensis - Gouiric-Cavalli et al., 2015
Edaphodon stenobryus - Cope, 1875
Edaphodon ubaghsi - Storms in Leriche, 1927

Species of questionable validity include:
Edaphodon leptognathus - Agassiz, 1843
Edaphodon sedgwickii -  Agassiz, 1843 (possibly synonymous with E. agassizi)

References

External links
 

Extinct animals of New Zealand
Callorhinchidae
Prehistoric cartilaginous fish genera
Cretaceous cartilaginous fish
Aptian genus first appearances
Piacenzian extinctions
Mooreville Chalk